Jack Hamilton  (15 November 1928 – 30 May 1990) was an Australian rules football player in the Victorian Football League (VFL) before becoming a prominent administrator.

Hamilton was known as a tough full-back who played with Collingwood Football Club in the VFL (later to be renamed as the Australian Football League) from 1948 to 1957 for a career total of 154 games and 16 goals. He also represented Victoria in one game.

His administrative career spanned 29 years and included:
 VFL Assistant Secretary 1957–1967,
 VFL Manager Administration 1967–1977,
 General Manager 1977–1984,
 Chief Commissioner 1984–1986.

Hamilton was made a Member of the Order of Australia in the 1984 Queen's Birthday Honours for "service to the sport of Australian Football".

Hamilton died in a car accident while travelling home from a weekend in the country.

Hamilton was inducted to the Australian Football Hall of Fame in 1996.

References

External links

Australian Football Hall of Fame

Australian Football Hall of Fame inductees
Collingwood Football Club players
Ivanhoe Amateurs Football Club players
VFL/AFL administrators
Road incident deaths in Victoria (Australia)
1928 births
1990 deaths
Australian rules footballers from Melbourne
Members of the Order of Australia